Sahl al-Tustarī or Sahl Shushtarī according to Persian custom, born Abū Muḥammad Sahl ibn ʿAbd Allāh (c.818 CE (203 AH) – c.896 CE (283 AH)), was a Persian Sunni Muslim scholar and early classical Sufi mystic. He founded the Salimiyah Muslim theological school, which was named after his disciple Muhammad ibn Salim.

Tustari is most famous for his controversial claim that "I am the Proof of God for the created beings and I am a proof for the saints (awliya) of my time" and for his well-known Tafsir, a commentary on and interpretation of the Qur'an.

Biography
Sahl al-Tustari was born in the fortress town of Tustar (Arabic) or Shushtar (Persian) in Khūzestān Province in what is now southwestern Iran.

From an early age he led an ascetic life with frequent fasting and study of the Qur'an and Hadith, the oral traditions, of the Prophet Muhammad. He practised repentance (tawbah) and, above all, constant remembrance of God (dhikr). This eventually culminated in a direct and intimate rapport with God with whom he considered himself a special friend and one of the spiritual elect.

Tustari was under the direction of the Sufi saint Dhul-Nun al-Misri for a time, and Tustari in his turn was one of the Sufi mystic Mansur Al-Hallaj's early teachers.

Tustari was also near to the Islamic Scholars of Hadith when he met (Abu Dawood) he said "O Abu Dawud, I want something from you." He said, "What is it?" Sahl said, "On a condition that you say that you will fulfill it if possible." Abu Dawud replied in the affirmative. Sahl said, "Get out your tongue with which you narrated the hadiths of the Prophet (peace be upon him) so that I kiss it." Abu Dawud accept that and Sahl kissed his tongue. This shows the close proximate of early hadith scholars and early sufis.

In these early days when the Sufis were becoming established mostly in Baghdad (the capital of modern Iraq), the most notable Sufis of the time elsewhere were: Tustari in southwestern Iran, Al-Tirmidhi in Central Asia and the Malamatiyya or "People of Blame". Also the chief leader of the Hanabila, al-Barbahari, was a disciple of Tustari. 

An Islamic scholar who commented on and interpreted the Qur'an, Tustari maintained that the Qur'an "contained several levels of meaning", which included the outer or zahir and the inner or batin. Another key idea that he unravelled was the meaning of the Prophet Muhammad's saying "I am He and He is I, save that I am I, and He is He", explaining it "as a mystery of union and realization at the center of the Saint's personality, called the sirr ('the secret'), or the heart, where existence joins Being." Tustari also "was the first to put" the Sufi exercise of remembrance of God, Dhikr, "on a firm theoretical basis."

Works

Sayings
 "I am the Proof of God for the created beings and I am a proof for the saints (awliya) of my time"
 Asked "What is food?" Tustari replied: "Food is contemplation of the Living One."
 "Whoever wakes up worrying about what he will eat -- shun him!"
 "If any one shuts his eye to God for a single moment, he will never be rightly guided all his life long"

Notes

References

Further reading

External links
 Al-Tustari: A short bio by Shaykh Gibril Haddad

Sufi mystics
Iranian Sufis
People from Shushtar
810s births
896 deaths
9th-century Iranian people